(born 20 December 1969) is a Japanese politician and former Nordic combined skier who won several medals at the Winter Olympics, the FIS Nordic World Ski Championships, and the Holmenkollen ski festival.

He won gold medals in the Nordic combined team events at the 1992 and 1994 Winter Olympics. Ogiwara won two gold medals each in the 15 km individual (1993, 1997) and the team (3 x 10 km: 1993, 4 x 5 km: 1995) events and one bronze in the 7.5 km sprint (1999) at the Nordic skiing world championships. In 1995, Ogiwara won the Nordic combined event at the Holmenkollen ski festival.

Ogiwara received the Holmenkollen medal in 1995, becoming the first non-European and first Asian to ever receive the honor. At the 1998 Winter Olympics, he took the Athlete's Oath.

Ogiwara's twin brother Tsugiharu competed with him at the 1995 FIS Nordic World Ski Championships in Thunder Bay, Ontario, sharing a gold with him in the 4 x 5 km team event.

Ogiwara has also stood as candidate for Liberal Democratic Party.

Kenji Ogiwara ran for the Mayor of Nagano election, which was executed on October 31, 2021, won 98,711 votes, and was appointed Mayor of Nagano on November 11, 2021.

References

References 
 
 Holmenkollen medalists - click Holmenkollmedaljen for downloadable pdf file 
 Holmenkollen winners since 1892 - click Vinnere for downloadable pdf file 
 IOC 1998 Winter Olympics

1969 births
Living people
People from Gunma Prefecture
Waseda University alumni
Nordic combined skiers at the 1992 Winter Olympics
Nordic combined skiers at the 1994 Winter Olympics
Nordic combined skiers at the 1998 Winter Olympics
Nordic combined skiers at the 2002 Winter Olympics
Holmenkollen medalists
Holmenkollen Ski Festival winners
Japanese male Nordic combined skiers
Olympic Nordic combined skiers of Japan
Olympic gold medalists for Japan
Japanese sportsperson-politicians
Members of the House of Councillors (Japan)
FIS Nordic Combined World Cup winners
Japanese twins
Liberal Democratic Party (Japan) politicians
Olympic medalists in Nordic combined
Twin sportspeople
FIS Nordic World Ski Championships medalists in Nordic combined
Medalists at the 1992 Winter Olympics
Medalists at the 1994 Winter Olympics
Universiade medalists in nordic combined
Oath takers at the Olympic Games
Universiade gold medalists for Japan
Competitors at the 1989 Winter Universiade
Competitors at the 1991 Winter Universiade